The Dainik Purbokone is a Bengali-language daily newspaper in Bangladesh, and one of the leading newspaper published in Chittagong. The newspaper was founded in 1986. According to the data published by the Department of Films and Publications, under the Ministry of Information, on 28 August 2019, its circulation of 62,100 copies was the largest of the national dailies published from Chittagong. In the assessment of the Bangladesh Press Institute in 1994, Purbokone was mentioned as the best daily.

History
Purbokone was founded by Mohammad Yusuf Chowdhury in 1986. During its first publish on first published on 10 February 1986, K G Mustafa, an acclaimed country baroness and recipient of Ekushey Padak, served as editor. In 1989, Taslim Uddin Chowdhury, son of Yusuf Chowdhury, took charge of the daily as the editor. In 2007, Taslim became the chairman of Purbokone Group and serves the daily as chief editor till his death in 2017. The print version has been published daily from the beginning. In 2015 it also made its online edition.

Editors
The current editor of the daily is M Ramiz Uddin Chowdhury.

See also
 List of newspapers in Bangladesh

References

External links
 

Publications established in 1986
1986 establishments in Bangladesh
Bengali-language newspapers published in Bangladesh
Daily newspapers published in Bangladesh
Newspapers published in Chittagong